Server Somanna is a 1993 Indian Kannada-language film directed by K. Vasu.The film is an official remake of the 1964 Tamil film Server Sundaram. This film stars Jaggesh and Abhijeeth along with actress Rambha making her debut in acting. The film was a blockbuster at the box office.

Cast
 Jaggesh as Somanna 
 Rambha as Sudha 
 Abhijeeth as Sridhar 
 Pandari Bai
 Sihi Kahi Chandru
 Shivaram
 M. S. Umesh
Arasikere raju 
Killer Venkatesh 
M. D. Kaushik as Raja 
Junior Narasimharaju as Manju 
Disco Shanthi 
Sudha Narasimharaju 
 Dwarakish...guest appearance
 Tara...guest appearance
 Umashri...guest appearance
 Chi. Udaya Shankar...guest appearance

Songs

Impact
Jaggesh's wife Parimala calls this film her favorite film of Jaggesh. Kannada actress Megha Goankar said that she liked the film.

References

1990s Kannada-language films
1993 films
Kannada remakes of Tamil films
Indian comedy films
Films scored by Raj–Koti
1993 comedy films